The 1926 Army Cadets football team represented the United States Military Academy in the 1926 college football season. In their first season under head coach Biff Jones, the Cadets compiled a  record, shut out four of their nine opponents, and outscored all opponents by a combined total of 240 to 71.  In the annual Army–Navy Game, the Cadets tied the Midshipmen at 21.  The team's only loss came to Notre Dame by a 7 to 0 score. The team was ranked No. 11 in the nation in the Dickinson System ratings released in December 1926.
 
Four Army players were recognized on the All-America team. Tackle Bud Sprague was a consensus first-team honoree with first-team designations from the Associated Press (AP) and the Central Press Association (CP). Sprague was later inducted into the College Football Hall of Fame. Halfback Harry Wilson was selected as a first-team honoree by Walter Camp, the All-America Board, Collier's Weekly, the International News Service, and the Newspaper Enterprise Association. Guard Ernest Schmidt was selected as a first-team player by the New York Sun. Center Maurice Daly was selected as a second-team honoree by the New York Sun.

Schedule

Players
 Charles Born - end
 Samuel Brentnall - end
 Red Cagle - halfback (College Football Hall of Fame)
 Clyde A. Dahl
 Maurice F. Daly
 Garrison H. Davidson
 Louis A. Hammack
 Norris B. Harbold
 Neil B. Harding
 Orville Hewitt - fullback
 Thomas R. Lynch
 Arthur W. Meehan
 John H. Murrell
 George W. Perry
 LaVerne G. Saunders
 Ernest G. Schmidt
 Lyle Seeman
 Bud Sprague - tackle (College Football Hall of Fame)
 Thomas J. H. Trapnell
 Harry Wilson - captain (College Football Hall of Fame)

Coaches
 Head coach: Biff Jones
 Assistant coaches: Major Sasse, Lt. Bryan, Lt. Farwick, Lt. Wood, Lt. Wicks, Lt. Myers, Lt. Johnson
 Trainer: Wandle

References

Army
Army Black Knights football seasons
Army Cadets football